Khaleseh Divani (also Romanized as Khāleşeh Dīvānī and Khāleseh-Ye-Dīvānī) is a village in Golzar Rural District, in the Central District of Bardsir County, Kerman Province, Iran. At the 2006 census, its population was 39, in 9 families.

References 

Populated places in Bardsir County